Seth Gandrud is an American actor from North Dakota and currently living in Los Angeles, California. He is known for several films including The Crypt, Dead Enders, Perspective, Promise, and for the role of Dr. Nasir in the film Isis Rising: Curse of the Lady Mummy. Currently he is the host of the television talk show Men with No Lives.

Filmography

Feature films

Television

References

 http://www.filmthreat.com/reviews/41502/
 https://web.archive.org/web/20131211024605/http://www.horrorreview.com/2009/tcpromise2009.html
 http://www.ilikehorrormovies.com/2011/08/dead-enders-2010.html

External links
 
 http://westfieldentgrp.com/catalog_22.html
 The New York Times Movies
 http://www.fandango.com/sethgandrud/overview/p632482
 
 https://web.archive.org/web/20131210113649/http://www.screened.com/seth-gandrud/14-430708/
 http://www.cinemagia.ro/filme-cu-seth-gandrud-140318/
 http://www.ofdb.de/view.php?page=liste&Name=Seth+Gandrud

Male actors from North Dakota
American male film actors
21st-century American male actors
Living people
Year of birth missing (living people)